Mistaken Identity is a 2011 Philippine television drama romance series broadcast by GMA Network. Starring Lovi Poe and Rocco Nacino, it premiered on July 23, 2011, on the network's Saturday morning line up. The series concluded on August 27, 2011, with a total of 6 episodes.

Cast and characters

Lead cast
 Lovi Poe as Ada
 Rocco Nacino as Sinag

Supporting cast
Karel Marquez as Princess Violeta
Luis Alandy as Prince Kali
Gloria Diaz as Queen Mercedes
Jace Flores as Apostol
Izzy Trazona as Mermina
Miguel Tanfelix as Nathan
Andrea Torres as Celia 
Evangeline Pascual as Queen Merlinda
G. Toengi as Miranda

Ratings
According to AGB Nielsen Philippines' Mega Manila household television ratings, the pilot episode of Mistaken Identity earned a 14.2% rating. While the final episode scored a 6.5% rating in Mega Manila People/Individual television ratings.

References

External links
 

2011 Philippine television series debuts
2011 Philippine television series endings
Filipino-language television shows
GMA Network drama series
Philippine romance television series
Television shows set in the Philippines